Mattuthavani is a 2012 Indian Tamil-language drama film written and directed by Pavithran. The film stars Ramkiran and Menaka  and Meetha , whilst Soori appeared in a supporting role, with music composed by Deva. The film had opened to poor reviews. Notably, this film also marked the comeback for actress, Menaka Suresh in Tamil cinemas after 26 years.

Cast
 Ramkiran as Ram
 Meenakshi as Maheshwari 
 Dhandapani as Samudrakani 
 Soori as Ram's friend
 Vimal as Ram's friend 
 Sathish
 Meetha 
 Ponnambalam
 Menaka
 Singamuthu
 Bonda Mani as Tea seller

Production
The film was launched in May 2007 with director Pavithran announcing a comeback to films but it developed slowly as a result of a series of legal problems. In November 2009, director Pavithran held an event to showcase the film to the media, revealing that the film would feature an all new cast.

Soundtrack 
Soundtrack was composed by Deva. Former actor-politician M. K. Muthu recorded a song for the film in 2008, while Lakshmi Amma of Paruthi Veeran fame also sang in the album composed by Deva.

Release
The delay of the film meant that planned release dates were regularly evaded, with the earliest such date being August 2007. The film stepped up promotions to have an April 2009 releasem though such plans were also unsuccessful. A critic from The Times of India wrote that "It is difficult to believe that the movie is directed by the same Pavithran who had earlier given us movies like “Suriyan” and “I love India”".

The film eventually released on 20 April 2012 and fared poorly at the box office.

References

External links
 

2012 action drama films
Indian action drama films
2012 films
2010s Tamil-language films
Films scored by Deva (composer)